Xoybûn or Khoyboun was a Kurdish nationalist political party, that is known for leading the Ararat rebellion, commanded by Ihsan Nuri. Many Armenians joined the movement as well, the party was active in all parts of Kurdistan until it was dissolved in 1946.

Establishment
On the 5 October 1927, in Bhamdoun, Greater Lebanon, during a congress of several Kurdish notables, Xoybûn was founded by members of the Society for the Elevation of Kurdistan, Azadî (Kürdistan Teali Cemiyeti), Kürt Teşkilat-ı İçtimaiye Cemiyeti and Kürt Millet Fırkası. Prominent members of the congress where Kamuran Bedir Khan, Celadet Bedir Khan, Memduh Selim, Mehdi Saïd (the brother of Sheikh Said) and Haco Agha amongst others. In the same month the Xoybûn achieved a treaty with the Armenian Revolution Federation (ARF/Dashnaktsutyun). The treaty was negotiated in Beirut on the 29 October by Vahan Papazian for the ARF and by Celadet Bedir Khan, Mehmet Şükru Sekban, Ali Riza (the son of Sheik Said and others on the side of the Xoybun. The Xoybûn had two separate sections. And armed section and a political one. The armed wing was led by Ihsan Nuri, an Ottoman soldier. The political wing was based in Damascus, represented in several western countries and mostly by members of the Bedirxan family. The Xoybûn presented itself as a progressive but pragmatic organization, which had an independence as a goal wanted to learn from former decisions which led to the failure of the Sheikh Said rebellion.

Celadet Alî Bedirxan who was elected as its president as well as Süleymniyeli Kerim Rüstem Bey, Memduh Selim, Mehmet Şükrü Sekban, Haco Agha, Ramanlı Emin, Ali Rıza, Bozan bey Shahin and Mustafa bey Şahin were elected as members of the first central committee of Xoybûn. The Xoybûn can be viewed as a counterweight to the SAK led by Seyyit Abdul Kadir, who favored autonomy for the Kurds instead of independence. Turkey severely opposed the activities for Kurdish independence which amounted to the closure of Xoybuns activities in Aleppo in 1928.

Ararat rebellion

Under the leadership of Celadet Alî Bedirxan, Kamuran Alî Bedirxan, Ekrem Cemilpaşa, Memdûh Selîm and others, Xoybûn decided to promote Ihsan Nuri, a former officer in the Ottoman and Turkish armies, to general (pasha) and sent him to Erzurum with 20 comrades. They published a newspaper named Agirî. The Republic of Ararat declared its independence on 8 October 1927.

The central committee of Xoybûn appointed Ibrahim Heski, who was one of the chieftains of Jalali tribe, to the governorship of Agirî Province and Ihsan Nuri Pasha to the post of general commander of the Kurdish Armed Forces. Xoybûn also made appeals to the Great Powers and the League of Nations, but under pressure from Turkey the British Empire and France restricted the activities of those involved in the Xoybûn. Turkey accused Kurdish and Armenian rebels several times to have invaded Turkey with the aim to assassinate Mustafa Kemal. The Ararat rebellion was subsequently put down by Turkish forces in 1931.

References

Sources 

 
 
 

 
 
 

Kurdish organisations
Kurdish separatism in Turkey
Ararat rebellion
Organizations established in 1927
Organizations disestablished in 1946
Kurdish nationalist organizations
Rebel groups in Turkey